Russkaya Beseda was a Russian literary magazine founded in Moscow, Russian Empire, in 1856 by Alexander Koshelev who remained its editor-in-chief until 1858, when Ivan Aksakov joined in as co-editor. The magazine was published on a bi-monthly basis and was belonged to the Slavophile movement; most prominent in it were the literature, science and criticism sections. Selskoye Blagoustroistvo (Agrarian landscaping) was added as a supplement in 1858–1859. Russkaya Beseda targeted for broad and mixed readership and but, frequently covered articles about the future of the Slavic peoples. Among the authors who regularly contributed to the magazine, were Sergei Aksakov, Vladimir Dal, Aleksey K. Tolstoy, Alexander Ostrovsky, Aleksey Khomyakov, Fyodor Tyutchev, Ivan Nikitin, Taras Shevchenko. It ceased publication in 1860.

References

Defunct literary magazines published in Europe
Defunct magazines published in Russia
Magazines established in 1856
Magazines disestablished in 1860
Magazines published in Moscow
Russian-language magazines
Literary magazines published in Russia
Bi-monthly magazines